This is a list of synchronised swimmers:

A 

 Reem Abdalazem
 Aziza Abdelfattah
 Brooke Abel
 Yumi Adachi
 Beatrice Adelizzi
 Marianne Aeschbacher
 Nour El-Afandi
 Wendy Aguilar
 Sakiko Akutsu
 Lisa Alexander
 Olivia Allison
 Eloise Amberger
 Ana Amicarella
 Marta Amorós
 Lolita Ananasova
 Aglaia Anastasiou
 Teresa Andersen
 Jenny-Lyn Anderson
 Marie Annequin
 Mónica Antich
 Yelena Antonova
 Ai Aoki
 Miho Arai
 Laura Augé
 Nuria Ayala
 Elena Azarova

B 

 Kristen Babb-Sprague
 Lamyaa Badawi
 Hagar Badran
 Yvette Baker
 Hetty Balkenende
 Giada Ballan
 Sue Baross Nesbitt
 Carrie Barton
 Alison Bartosik
 Clara Basiana
 Lyne Beaumont
 Geneviève Bélanger
 Coral Bentley
 Soňa Bernardová
 Pascale Besson
 Serena Bianchi
 Suzannah Bianco
 Sarah Bombell
 Edith Boss
 Marjolijn Both
 Cinthia Bouhier
 Rachel le Bozec
 Nadine Brandl
 Janice Bremner
 Mara Brunetti
 Magdalena Brunner
 Olga Brusnikina
 Giovanna Burlando
 Donella Burridge
 Olia Burtaev

C 

 Alba María Cabello
 Michelle Calkins
 Ethan Calleja
 Michelle Cameron
 Lourdes Candini
 Anne Capron
 Ona Carbonell
 Sonia Cárdeñas
 Ximena Carias
 Manuela Carnini
 Brunella Carrafelli
 Paula Carvalho
 Tessa Carvalho
 Claire Carver-Dias
 Chiara Cassin
 Léa Catania
 Maurizia Cecconi
 Paola Celli
 Linda Cerruti
 Erin Chan
 Chang Hao
 Chang Si
 Maëva Charbonnier
 Jessica Chase
 Chen Xiaojun
 Chen Xuan
 Chen Yu
 Mariya Chernyayeva
 Virginie Isabelle Chevalet
 Vlada Chigireva
 Margaux Chrétien
 Maria Christodoulou
 Mariana Cifuentes
 Monica Cirulli
 Karen Clark
 Katie Clark
 Tammy Cleland
 Raquel Corral
 Rosa Costa
 Candy Costie
 Margalida Crespí
 Esther Croes
 Tamara Crow
 Janet Culp
 Eszter Czékus

D 

 Lisa Daniels
 Nina Daniels
 Aya Darwish
 Tracey Davis
 Anastasia Davydova
 Iphinoé Davvetas
 Katie Dawkins
 Virginie Dedieu
 Isabel Delgado
 Nuria Diosdado
 Erin Dobratz
 Alice Dominici
 Tamika Domrow
 Apolline Dreyfuss
 Jessika Dubuc
 Alžběta Dufková
 Stéphanie Durocher
 Becky Dyroen-Lancer

E 

 Eva-Maria Edinger
 Ayano Egami
 Catrien Eijken
 Marijke Engelen
 Anastasia Ermakova

F 

 Charlotte Fabre
 Julie Fabre
 Nara Falcón
 Fan Jiachen
 Roberta Farinelli
 Feng Yu
 Bia and Branca Feres
 Celeste Ferraris
 Nayara Figueira
 Costanza Fiorentini
 Pamela Fischer
 Manila Flamini
 Karen Fonteyne
 Jo-Annie Fortin
 Sylvie Fréchette
 Heike Friedrich
 Eleftheria Ftouli
 Fu Yuling
 Andrea Fuentes
 Tina Fuentes
 Raika Fujii
 Michiyo Fujimaru
 Juka Fukumura

G 

 Marie-Pierre Gagné
 Marie-Pier Boudreau Gagnon
 Catherine Garceau
 Iryna Gayvoronska
 Dalia El-Gebaly
 Eleni Georgiou
 Kelly Geraghty
 Malin Gerdin
 María Elena Giusti
 Myriam Glez
 Anastasia Gloushkov
 Maryna Golyadkina
 Olivia González
 Lian Goodwin
 Effrosyni Gouda
 Olena Grechykhina
 Mariya Gromova
 Gu Beibei
 Gu Xiao
 Guan Zewen
 Camille Guerre
 Beulah Gundling
 Guo Cui
 Guo Li
 Berenice Guzmán

H 

 Ha Su-gyeong
 Aika Hakoyama
 Sharon Hambrook
 Bianca Hammett
 Gudrun Hänisch
 Saho Harada
 Samar Hassounah
 Aiko Hayashi
 He Xiaochu
 Thaïs Henríquez
 Muriel Hermine
 Nicole Hoevertsz
 Andrea Holland
 Caroline Holmyard
 Kate Hooven
 Hou Yingli
 Valérie Hould-Marchand
 Hu Ni
 Huang Xuechen
 Estel-Anaïs Hubaud
 Bert Hubbard

I 

 Caroline Imoberdorf
 Masayo Imura
 Yukiko Inui
 Apostolia Ioannou
 Chloé Isaac
 Natalia Ishchenko
 Yumiko Ishiguro
 Yoko Isoda
 Megumi Itō
 Mayo Itoyama
 Daria Iushko

J 

 Marie Jacobsson
 Jang Hyang-mi
 Rebecca Jasontek
 Jiang Tingting
 Jiang Wenwen
 Rei Jimbo
 Jin Na
 Christina Jones
 Jong Yon-hui
 Karen Josephson
 Sarah Josephson
 May Jouvenez

K 

 Mikhaela Kalancha
 Aliya Karimova
 Chloé Kautzmann
 Miho Kawabe
 Akiko Kawase
 Naoko Kawashima
 Annette Kellermann
 Ainur Kerey
 Youmna Khallaf
 Elvira Khasyanova
 Mary Killman
 Becky Kim
 Kim Mi-jinsu
 Kim Yong-mi
 Saeko Kimura
 Mariya Kiselyova
 Kanako Kitao
 Szofi Kiss
 Paula Klamburg
 Ganna Klymenko
 Jennifer Knobbs
 Chisa Kobayashi
 Hiromi Kobayashi
 Svetlana Kolesnichenko
 Erika Komura
 Takako Konishi
 Minami Kono
 Dominika Kopcik
 Daria Korobova
 Mariya Koroleva
 Maja Kos
 Mikako Kotani
 Evgenia Koutsoudi
 Anna Kozlova
 Kelly Kryczka
 Kasia Kulesza
 Anna Kulkina
 Katsiaryna Kulpo
 Olga Kuzhela

L 

 Sara Labrousse
 Christine Lagarde
 Amanda Laird
 Éve Lamoureux
 Livia Lang
 Giulia Lapi
 Christine Larsen
 Liisa Laurila
 Lilián Leal
 Stéphanie Leclair
 Emily LeSueur
 Fanny Létourneau
 Sara Levy
 Li Min
 Li Rouping
 Li Xiaolu
 Li Yuanyuan
 Li Zhen
 Liang Xinping
 Dannielle Liesch
 Lisa Lieschke
 Myriam Lignot
 Padded Lilies
 Tracy Little
 Liu Ou
 Cristiana Lobo
 Long Yan
 Eva López
 Laura López
 Roswitha Lopez
 Sara Lowe
 Vicki Lucass
 Alessia Lucchini
 Kristina Lum
 Luo Xi (born 1969)
 Luo Xi (born 1987)

M 

 Érika MacDavid
 Elisabeth Mahn
 Evanthia Makrygianni
 Aleksandr Maltsev
 Élise Marcotte
 Delphine Maréchal
 Elicia Marshall
 Kei Marumo
 Meritxell Mas
 Charlotte Massardier
 Ayako Matsumura
 Bill May
 Lauren McFall
 Beverly McKnight
 Ariadna Medina
 Lila Meesseman-Bakir
 Gemma Mengual
 Vanja Mičeta
 Tuesday Middaugh
 Giorgio Minisini
 Risako Mitsui
 Mai Mohamed
 Dahlia Mokbel
 Ana Montero
 Irene Montrucchio
 Carolina Moraes
 Isabela Moraes
 Gisela Morón
 Miwako Motoyoshi
 Monika Müller
 Beatrix Müllner
 Christine Müllner

N 

 Shayna Nackoney
 Riho Nakajima
 Kanami Nakamaki
 Mai Nakamura
 Stephanie Nesbitt
 Leonie Nichols
 Liliia Nizamova
 Kirstin Normand
 Sarah Northey
 Andrea Nott
 Claudia Novelo
 Olga Novokshchenova
 Letizia Nuzzo
 Anja Nyffeler

O 

 Fumiko Okuno
 Irena Olevsky
 Lourdes Olivera
 Anisya Olkhova
 Mariam Omar
 Kano Omata
 Annabelle Orme
 Katrina Orpwood
 Yuriko Osawa
 Tarren Otte
 Yelena Ovchinnikova
 Katia Overfeldt
 Frankie Owen

P 

 Joey Paccagnella
 Pan Yan
 Nastassia Parfenava
 Park Hyun-ha
 Park Hyun-sun
 Alexandra Patskevich
 Heather Pease
 Claudia Peczinka
 Olga Pelekanou
 Jill Penner
 Madeleine Perk
 Mariangela Perrupato
 Irina Pershina
 Sara Petrov
 Elisa Plaisant
 Evangelia Platanioti
 Laia Pons
 Lauriane Pontat
 Clara Porchetto
 Kim Probst
 Elena Prokofyeva

Q

R 

 Pilar Ramírez
 Paula Ramírez
 Isabelle Rampling
 Asha Randall
 Jenna Randall
 Magali Rathier
 Cari Read
 Aline Reich
 Ingrid Reich
 Samantha Reid
 Rachel Ren
 Anouk Renière-Lafrenière
 Kateryna Reznik
 Lisa Richaud
 Eva Riera
 Éva Riffet
 Irina Rodríguez
 Semon Rohloff
 Svetlana Romashina
 Tracie Ruiz
 Jana Rybářová

S 

 Oleksandra Sabada
 Katie Sadleir
 Lynette Sadleir
 Kateryna Sadurska
 Mariko Sakai
 Nouran Saleh
 Cristina Salvador
 Etel Sánchez
 Sofía Sánchez
 Sara Kamil-Yusof
 Anastasiya Savchuk
 Jill Savery
 Sara Savoia
 Shaza El-Sayed
 Gerlind Scheller
 Belinda Schmid
 Ariane Schneider
 Nathalie Schneyder
 Margit Schreib
 Karine Schuler
 Olga Sedakova
 Marija Senica
 Patricia Serneels
 Ione Serrano
 Kerry Shacklock
 Galina Shatnaya
 Nicola Shearn
 Shi Xin
 Alla Shishkina
 Anna Shorina
 Maria Shurochkina
 Heather Simmons-Carrasco
 Jacqueline Simoneau
 Karin Singer
 Chemene Sinson
 Katie Skelton
 Kenyon Smith
 Maribel Solis
 Despoina Solomou
 Jennifer Song
 Gláucia Soutinho
 Yelena Soya
 Beatrice Spaziani
 Lisa Steanes
 Courtenay Stewart
 Heather Strong
 Jill Sudduth
 Sun Qiuting
 Sun Wenyan
 Sun Yijing
 Emiko Suzuki
 Lucie Svrčinová
 Kseniya Sydorenko

T 

 Masako Tachibana
 Miya Tachibana
 Jacinthe Taillon
 Kaori Takahashi
 Aki Takayama
 Miho Takeda
 Tan Min
 Junko Tanaka
 Miyako Tanaka
 Tang Mengni
 Tao Hong
 Ana Tarrés
 Asuka Tasaki
 Juri Tatsumi
 Reidun Tatham
 Amanda Taylor
 Lara Teixeira
 Antonella Terenzi
 Christina Thalassinidou
 Despoina Theodoridou
 Laure Thibaud
 Margot Thien
 Karine Thomas
 Ruth Pickett Thompson
 Yvette Thuis
 Angelika Timanina
 Paola Tirados
 Tatyana Titova
 Arna Toktagan
 Gelena Topilina

U

V 

 Laila Vakil
 Darina Valitova
 Olga Vargas
 Bianca van der Velden
 Sonja van der Velden
 Helen Vanderburg
 Yuliya Vasilyeva
 Olga Vasyukova
 Fernanda Veirano
 Patricia Vila
 Penny Vilagos
 Vicky Vilagos
 Anna Voloshyna

W 

 Carolyn Waldo
 Wang Fang
 Wang Liuyi
 Wang Na
 Wang Ok-gyong
 Wang Qianyi
 Wang Xiaojie
 Bethany Walsh
 Estella Warren
 Valerie Welsh
 Cathryn Wightman
 Chloé Willhelm
 Carolyn Wilson
 Erin Woodley
 Alexandra Worisch
 Wu Chunlan
 Wu Yiwen
 Loren Wulfsohn
 Kim Wurzel

X 

 Xia Ye
 Xiao Yanning

Y 

 Anastasiya Yermakova
 Yin Chengxin
 Inna Yoffe
 Yoko Yoneda
 Yuko Yoneda
 Kurumi Yoshida
 Naomi Young
 Sahar Youssef
 Yu Lele

Z 

 Lorena Zaffalon
 Laura Zanazza
 Kendra Zanotto
 Zeng Zhen
 Zhang Xiaohuan
 Zhang Ying
 Aigerim Zhexembinova
 Olha Zolotarova
 Aleksandra Zueva
 Tamara Zwart

Synchronized swimmers
Synchronized swimming